John Cummings (February 16, 1905 – April 28, 1989) was an American film producer and director. He was best known for being a leading producer at MGM. He was the second husband of Betty Kern, daughter of Jerome Kern.

Cummings spent most of his career at his uncle Louis B. Mayer's studio, Metro-Goldwyn-Mayer, where he began work in the 1920s. Mayer started his nephew out as an office boy and expected him to work his way up through the ranks.

Cummings became a staff producer at MGM in 1934, where he worked in the B-feature unit for two years. In 1936, he produced the extravagant Cole Porter musical Born to Dance, which established his reputation as a respected producer. Cummings remained at MGM even after his uncle was fired from the studio in 1951, working with talent such as the Marx Brothers, Red Skelton, Esther Williams, and Fred Astaire and producing some of the era's best-known musicals, including 1953's Kiss Me Kate and Seven Brides for Seven Brothers in 1954, for which he received an Academy Award nomination. He left MGM to become an independent producer affiliated with Twentieth Century-Fox and produced the 1959 remake of The Blue Angel and the 1960 movie version of the Abe Burrows-Cole Porter Broadway musical Can-Can. In 1964, he returned to MGM one last time to produce the Elvis Presley musical Viva Las Vegas. Other credits included Easy to Wed, It Happened in Brooklyn, Three Little Words, The Last Time I Saw Paris, Interrupted Melody, and The Teahouse of the August Moon.

Biography
Jack Cummings was the son of Ida Mayer Cummings, sister of Louis B Mayer. He had two sisters, Ruth (married to film director Roy Rowland) and Mitzi (married to film producer Sol Baer Fielding), as well as a younger half brother Leonard 'Sonny' Cummings.

He went to work at the MGM prop department when seventeen. He worked as an office boy, script clerk, assistant director and short subject director for MGM studios before producing his first feature film, The Winning Ticket in 1934.

He worked for three years on Interrupted Melody. He also spent a number of years developing Seven Brides for Seven Brothers.

In March 1955 Cummings announced he would leave MGM once the 18 months left on his contract ran out.

In June 1957 he formed a company with Louis B Mayer to make two films. The Dragon Tree and Paint Your Wagon. However Mayer died before either could be made. In June 1958 Cummings signed a deal with 20th Century Fox.

Personal life
Mr. Cummings was survived by his four daughters, Julie Cummings Siff, of Manhattan, Kathy Cummings St. Aubin, of Los Angeles, Linda Kern Cummings, of Danville, Ky., and Carla Luisa Cummings, of Los Angeles.

Partial filmography 
The Winning Ticket (1935)
Tarzan Escapes (1936)
 Born to Dance (1936)
 Broadway Melody of 1938 (1937)
Yellow Jack (1938)
 Listen, Darling (1938)
Honolulu (1939)
 Broadway Melody of 1940 (1940)
Two Girls on Broadway (1940)
Go West (1940)
Ship Ahoy (1942)
 I Dood It (1943)
Broadway Rhythm (1944)
 Bathing Beauty (1944)
Easy to Wed (1946)
 It Happened in Brooklyn (1947)
 Fiesta (1947)
The Romance of Rosy Ridge (1947)
The Stratton Story (1949)
 Neptune's Daughter (1949)
 Two Weeks with Love (1950)
 Three Little Words (1950)
Excuse My Dust (1951)
 Texas Carnival (1951)
 Lovely to Look At (1952)
Sombrero (1953)
 Give a Girl a Break (1953)
 Kiss Me Kate (1953)
 Seven Brides for Seven Brothers (1954)
The Last Time I Saw Paris (1954)
Many Rivers to Cross (1955)
Interrupted Melody (1955)
The Teahouse of the August Moon (1956)
The Blue Angel (1959)
 Can-Can (1960)
The Second Time Around (1961)
Bachelor Flat (1962)
 Viva La Vegas (1964)
Pipe Dreams (1976)

Awards and nominations 
27th Academy Awards, held March 1955. Nominated for Best Picture (Seven Brides for Seven Brothers). Lost to Sam Spiegel for On the Waterfront.

References

External links 
 
 Allmovie bio
 Jack Cummings, mother and siblings

1905 births
1989 deaths
20th-century American businesspeople
American film directors
American film producers
American people of Ukrainian-Jewish descent
Place of birth missing